Milesia limbipennis  is a species of hoverfly in the family Syrphidae.

Distribution
Java.

References

Insects described in 1848
Eristalinae
Diptera of Asia
Taxa named by Pierre-Justin-Marie Macquart